Mafia is the sixth studio album by American heavy metal band Black Label Society, released on March 8, 2005 by Artemis Records. It is one of the band's most commercially successful releases, selling over 250,000 copies in the United States. The track "In This River" was written before the death of Zakk Wylde's friend and fellow guitarist Dimebag Darrell, but it has since been dedicated to him. In 2005, the album was ranked number 15 on Billboard Album Chart.

Track listing

The track "Fire It Up" was featured in the 2005 video game Guitar Hero.
The end of "Death March" quotes the intro to "Fire It Up".

Personnel
Black Label Society
Zakk Wylde – vocals, guitars, bass, talk box, Minimoog, piano, PolyBox
James LoMenzo – bass, vocal break on "Say What You Will"
Craig Nunenmacher – drums, shaker

Additional performances
Barry "Lord" Conley – Buchla synthesizer, Minimoog, piano, PolyBox, OutofControl-atron
Eddie Mapp – Minimoog on "Say What You Will"

Production
Produced by Zakk Wylde
Associate producer and engineer – Barry Conley
Mixed by Eddie Mapp and Barry Conley
Mastered by Steve Marcussen
Artwork concept – Zakk Wylde
Illustrations – Rob "RA" Arvizu
Artwork layout and design – Jason Levy (NoLimitAmerica.com)
Management – Bob Ringe (Survival Management)

Charts

Album
Billboard (United States)

Singles
Billboard (United States)

References

2005 albums
Black Label Society albums
Artemis Records albums